Ebbesen is a Danish-Norwegian patronymic surname meaning "son of Ebbe". Notable people with the surname include:

Eskild Ebbesen (born 1972), Danish lightweight rower
Jørgen Tandberg Ebbesen (1812–1887), Norwegian politician
Joseph B. Ebbesen (1925–2014), American politician and optometrist
Just Bing Ebbesen (1847–1929), Norwegian priest and politician
Margunn Ebbesen (born 1962), Norwegian politician
Niels Ebbesen (1308–1340), Danish squire and national hero
Niels Ebbesen Hansen (1866–1950), Danish-American horticulturist, botanist and agronomist
Thomas Ebbesen (born 1954), Norwegian physical chemist
Torben Ebbesen (born 1945), Danish sculptor and painter

See also
HDMS Niels Ebbesen (F339) or HMS Annan (K404), was a Ship of the Royal Canadian Navy

References

Danish-language surnames
Norwegian-language surnames